Zhang Ling (born 13 April 1981) is a female Chinese middle-distance runner.

On 18 October 1997 in Shanghai she ran the 1500 metres in 3:54.52 minutes. This ranked her eighth in the world all-time lists, behind Qu Yunxia, Jiang Bo, Lang Yinglai, Wang Junxia, Tatyana Kazankina, Yin Lili, Paula Ivan, Lan Lixin and Olga Dvirna. This is also the world record for youth (aged 17 or less) athletes.

Achievements

References

1981 births
Living people
Chinese female middle-distance runners